This was the first edition of the tournament.

Jaimee Fourlis won the title, defeating İpek Öz in the final, 7–6(7–0), 6–2.

Seeds

Draw

Finals

Top half

Bottom half

References

Main Draw

Brasov Open - Singles